Josh Forrest (born February 24, 1992) is a former American football linebacker. He played college football at Kentucky and was drafted by the Los Angeles Rams in the sixth round of the 2016 NFL Draft.

College career
Forrest played college football for the University of Kentucky. He originally was a reserved and did not start until his junior year, where he led the Wildcats in tackles for two years straight.

Professional career

Los Angeles Rams
Forrest was selected by the Los Angeles Rams on in the sixth round, 190th overall pick in the 2016 NFL Draft. On June 9, 2016, the Rams signed Forrest to a four-year contract with the team. He was placed on injured reserve on November 22, 2016.

On September 2, 2017, Forrest was waived/injured by the Rams and placed on injured reserve. He was released on September 9, 2017.

Seattle Seahawks
On October 16, 2017, Forrest was signed to the Seattle Seahawks' practice squad. He was promoted to the active roster on November 7, 2017. He was placed on injured reserve on December 2, 2017.

On August 2, 2018, Forrest re-signed with the Seahawks. He was waived on September 1, 2018.

References

External links
Kentucky Wildcats bio

1992 births
Living people
African-American players of American football
American football linebackers
Kentucky Wildcats football players
Los Angeles Rams players
Paducah Tilghman High School alumni
Players of American football from Kentucky
Seattle Seahawks players
Sportspeople from Paducah, Kentucky
21st-century African-American sportspeople